Watson and the Shark is an oil painting by the American painter John Singleton Copley, depicting the rescue of the English boy Brook Watson from a shark attack in Havana, Cuba. Copley, then living in London, painted three versions.  The 1778 version is in the National Gallery of Art, Washington, D.C. A second, full-size 1778 replica is now in the Museum of Fine Arts, Boston, and a third, smaller, 1782 version with a more vertical composition, is in the Detroit Institute of Arts.

The paintings are based on an attack that took place in Havana harbor in 1749. Brook Watson, then a 14-year-old cabin boy on the Royal Consort, lost his leg in the attack and was not rescued until the third attempt, which is the subject of the painting. Watson, having had a military career and become a successful merchant, commissioned the painting from Copley a quarter of century after the event. Watson went on to be chairman of Lloyd's of London, a Member of Parliament, and Lord Mayor of London.

Painting
Copley and Brook Watson became friends after the American artist arrived in London in 1774. Watson commissioned him to create a painting of the 1749 event, and Copley produced three versions. It was the first of a series of large-scale historical paintings that Copley would concentrate on after settling in London. The painting is romanticized: the gory detail of the injury is hidden beneath the waves, though there is a hint of blood in the water. The figure of Watson is based on the statue of the "Borghese Gladiator", by Agasias of Ephesus, in the Louvre. Other apparent influences are Renaissance art, and the ancient statue of Laocoön and his Sons, which Copley may have seen in Rome. Copley was probably also influenced by Benjamin West's The Death of General Wolfe, and the growing popularity of romantic painting.

The composition of the rescuers in the boat shows hints of Peter Paul Rubens's Jonah Thrown into the Sea, and both Rubens's Miraculous Draught of Fishes and Raphael's painting of the same name. The facial expressions show a marked resemblance to those in Charles Le Brun's Conférence de M. Le Brun sur l'expression générale et particulière, an influential work published in 1698; they portray a range of emotions, from fear to courage. Various elements of composition were changed as the painting progressed. Infrared analysis shows that the old boatswain was originally a young man, and preliminary sketches reveal that the black sailor at the rear of the boat, who also appears as the subject of Copley's Head of a Negro painted around the same time, was originally envisioned as a white man with long, flowing hair.

Copley had never visited Havana, and it is likely that he had never seen a shark, much less one attacking a person. He may have gleaned details of Havana harbor from prints and book illustrations: he includes the real landmark of Morro Castle in the background on the right. The shark is less convincing and includes anatomical features not found in sharks, such as lips, forward-facing eyes that resemble a tiger's more than a shark's and air blowing out from the animal's "nostrils".

The painting was exhibited at the Royal Academy in 1778. Copley produced a second, full-size replica for himself the same year, which is now in the Museum of Fine Arts, Boston. His third and smaller version, with a vertical format produced by extending the view of the sky above, is in the Detroit Institute of Arts. The Beaverbrook Art Gallery (Fredericton, Canada) has a miniature version of this piece, attributed to Copley.

At his death, Watson bequeathed the 1807 painting to Christ's Hospital, with the hope that it would prove "a most usefull Lesson to Youth". In September 1819 the school's committee of almoners voted to accept the painting and place it in the great hall. The school later moved to Horsham, Sussex, where it was hung in the Dining Hall. In 1963, it sold the painting to the National Gallery of Art, Washington, D.C.

References

Further reading

External links

 John Singleton Copley in America, a full text exhibition catalog from The Metropolitan Museum of Art, which contains material on Watson and the Shark (fig. 12 and pp. 19–21).

1778 paintings
Black people in art
Paintings in the collection of the Detroit Institute of Arts
Collections of the National Gallery of Art
Maritime paintings
Paintings by John Singleton Copley
Paintings in the collection of the Museum of Fine Arts, Boston
Shark attacks
Sharks in art
Paintings of people